The IBM 416 was a tabulating machine released in 1941 and produced in Milan.

See also
List of IBM products

References 

416